The European Race Walking Team Championships (European Race Walking Cup until 2021) is a race walking event established in 1996, and organised by the European Athletic Association. In 1996, the team scores were calculated by aggregating the points (based on position in race) awarded to the first three finishers. From 1998, team scores were calculated by aggregating the positions of the first three finishers (seniors) or two finishers (juniors).

Championships

Men individual

20 km

50 km

Women individual

20 km

35 km

Defunct events

10 km

50 km

Men teams

20 km

50 km

Women team

20 km

35 km

Defunct events

10 km

50 km

Medal table

Overall (senior men and women)
Update to 2021 and including junior events.

Men team 20 km
Update to 2017.

Men team 50 km
Update to 2017.

Women team
Update to 2017.

List of Records of the European Race Walking Cup

Men

Women

Records in defunct events

Women's events

References

External links
European Race Walking Team Championships Poděbrady 2021 Statistics handbook
Medailist (Individual and teams)
European Race Walking Cup statistics
gbrathletics.com
marciaitaliana

 
Race walking
Racewalking competitions
Recurring sporting events established in 1996
Biennial athletics competitions